William Aubrey Cecil Darlington or W.A. Darlington (1890–1979), was a British writer and journalist who worked for many years as the drama critic of the Daily Telegraph newspaper.

Life and career

Darlington was primarily a journalist, working as a drama critic for the New York Times and The Daily Telegraph.

Darlington also wrote novels, most successfully with his 1920 comic work Alf's Button which was adapted into several films. He wrote an autobiography, I Do What I Like.

He was educated at Shrewsbury School and St John’s, Cambridge, before joining the army during the First World War.

Works

 Alf's Button (1920)
 Egbert (1925)
 Carpet Slippers (1931)
 I Do What I Like (MacDonald, 1947)
 The World of Gilbert and Sullivan (1950)
 Six Thousand and One Nights: Forty Years a Drama Critic (1960)

References

Further reading
 Low, Rachael The History of the British Film, 1918–1929 George Allen & Unwin, 1971

External links
 
 
 
 

1890 births
1979 deaths
British theatre critics
20th-century British novelists
People from Taunton
The Daily Telegraph people
British male novelists
Presidents of the Critics' Circle
20th-century English businesspeople